Nishimura is the 46th most common Japanese surname. Notable people with the surname include:
Akihiro Nishimura (politician) (born 1960), Japanese politician of the Liberal Democratic Party
Akihiro Nishimura (footballer) (born 1958), Japanese retired football player
Akira Nishimura (born 1953), Japanese composer
Aori Nishimura (born 2001), Japanese skateboarder
Ayaka Nishimura (born 1989), Japanese field hockey player
Chinami Nishimura (born 1970), Japanese voice actress
Chinami Nishimura (politician) (born 1967), Japanese politician of the Democratic Party of Japan
Eshin Nishimura (born 1933), Japanese Rinzai Zen Buddhist priest and former president of Hanazono University
Hiroki Nishimura (born 1994), Japanese cyclist
Hiroyuki Nishimura (born 1976), Japanese internet entrepreneur, founder of the Japanese textboard 2channel and current administrator of 4chan
Junji Nishimura (born 1955), Japanese animation director and producer
Kō Nishimura (1923–1997), Japanese actor
Ken Nishimura (1995), Japanese karateka
Kentaro Nishimura (born 1985), Japanese Nippon Professional Baseball player
Kodo Nishimura (born 1989), Japanese Buddhist monk and makeup artist
Koichi Nishimura (born 1973), Japanese volleyball player
Koji Nishimura (born 1984), Japanese football player
Kokichi Nishimura (born 1919) Japanese soldier and businessman
Kokū Nishimura (1915–2002), Japanese master shakuhachi player, teacher, and craftsman
Kyotaro Nishimura (1930–2022), Japanese novelist
Masahiko Nishimura (born 1960), Japanese theatre and film actor
Motoki Nishimura (born 1947), Japanese judoka
Osamu Nishimura, Japanese professional wrestler
Riki Nishimura (born 2005), Japanese K-pop Idol
Seiji Nishimura (born 1956), Japanese karateka
Nishimura Shigeki (1828–1902), educator and leader of the Meiji Enlightenment
Shingo Nishimura (born 1948), Japanese politician
Shōgorō Nishimura (born 1930), Japanese film director
Shoichi Nishimura, Japanese football player and manager
Shoji Nishimura (1889–1944), admiral in the Imperial Japanese Navy during World War II
Sō Nishimura (born 1936), Japanese manga artist
Subaru Nishimura (born 2003), Japanese footballer
Takuma Nishimura (1899–1951), general in the Imperial Japanese Army during World War II
Takuro Nishimura (born 1977), Japanese football player
Tomohiro Nishimura (born 1961), Japanese voice actor, actor, and singer-songwriter
Tomomichi Nishimura (born 1946), Japanese voice actor
Trina Nishimura, American voice actress
Yasufumi Nishimura (born 1999), Japanese footballer
Yasutoshi Nishimura (born 1962), Japanese politician of the Liberal Democratic Party
Yoshihiro Nishimura (born 1967), Japanese screenwriter, film director, special effects and makeup effects artist
Yoshitaka Nishimura (born 1982), Japanese composer
Yuichi Nishimura (born 1972), Japanese football referee
Yukie Nishimura (born 1967), Japanese pianist

See also
6306 Nishimura, a main-belt asteroid
Nishimura's catalyst, a hydrogenation catalyst named in honor of chemist Shigeo Nishimura

References

Japanese-language surnames